Eidlitz is a surname. Notable people with the surname include:

Cyrus L. W. Eidlitz (1853–1921), American architect
Dorothy Meigs Eidlitz (1891–1976), American photographer, arts patron and women's rights advocate
Leopold Eidlitz (1823–1908), American architect
Marc Eidlitz (1826–1892), American builder
Walther Eidlitz, called "Vāmana Dāsa" (1892–1976), Austrian writer, poet, Indologist and historian of religion

See also 
 Edlitz, Austria